Consorci de la Zona Franca is a skyscraper in Barcelona, Spain. Completed in 2005, has 22 floors and rises 88 meters.

See also 

 List of tallest buildings in Barcelona

References 

Skyscraper office buildings in Barcelona
Buildings and structures completed in 2005